= Ffffff =

FFFFFF or ffffff may refer to:

- The RGB hex triplet for the color white
- An extreme dynamic marking for fortissimo with 6 fs
